Alfredo "Freddy" Soto Jr. (June 22, 1970 – July 10, 2005) was an American comedian, writer and actor. His comedy act focused primarily on his upbringing in a Mexican American household.

Life and career
He was born in El Paso, Texas to Mexican parents. Soto moved to Los Angeles around 1990 and worked as a limousine driver for comedian Richard Pryor. He later worked as a doorman at The Comedy Store in West Hollywood, California.  Before long, Soto was headlining comedy clubs across the country.

In 2000, a situation comedy was developed starring Soto.  In 2001 and 2002, Soto toured as part of "The Three Amigos" with Carlos Mencia and Pablo Francisco.  He had his own comedy specials on Home Box Office and Comedy Central Presents and had guest shots on The Tonight Show with Jay Leno and The Late Late Show with Craig Kilborn.  In 2004, Soto had a role in the movie Spanglish starring Adam Sandler.

Death
On July 10, 2005, Soto performed at The Laugh Factory in Los Angeles.  Just hours after the performance, he died in his sleep at a friend's house. His cause of death was later determined to be a drug overdose. Fentanyl was one of the drugs involved in his death.

Filmography

References

External links

1970 births
2005 deaths
American stand-up comedians
Drug-related deaths in California
American people of Mexican descent
People from El Paso, Texas
20th-century American comedians
21st-century American comedians